West Kington is a village in Nettleton civil parish in Wiltshire, England. The village lies in the steeply wooded valley of the Broadmead Brook, a source of the Bybrook River, and is close to the county boundary with Gloucestershire.

Buildings
The Church of England parish church of St Mary the Virgin has a 13th and 15th century west tower. The rest of the church was rebuilt in 1856 to designs by the architect S.B. Gabriel of Bristol. It is Grade II* listed.

The farmhouse called Latimer Manor dates from the 16th century and is also Grade II* listed. It is believed to be named after Hugh Latimer, who had the living of West Kington in the early 16th century.

Notable people
Hugh Latimer, later Bishop of Worcester, was vicar of West Kington church from 1531, prior to the controversy in the reformation which led to his martyrdom in Oxford.

Television producer Dilys Breese retired to the village and is buried there.

In popular culture
The music video for the song "The Safety Dance" by the Canadian band Men Without Hats was filmed in West Kington in the summer of 1982.

References

Villages in Wiltshire